The British Rail Class 465 Networker is a class of 147 electric multiple units built by Metro-Cammell, British Rail Engineering Limited (BREL) and ABB Rail between 1991 and 1994. Originally operated by Network South East, these units are now run by Southeastern.

Background

The Network SouthEast sector of British Rail began the planning for the development of the Class 465 Networker in 1988, and invited a tender for 710 of the units to be built. The Class 465 was introduced in order to replace the 41-year-old Class 415 (4EPB) slam-door EMUs.

The first was delivered in December 1991 and the last in April 1995. The units entered passenger service from 1 December 1992 with a ceremony at Cannon Street station, by Transport Secretary John MacGregor. As part of the privatisation of British Rail, the 97 465/0s and 465/1s were sold to Eversholt Rail Group and the 50 Class 465/2s to Angel Trains.

All trains were originally supplied in Network SouthEast livery and branded "Kent Link Networker". They are mostly used on suburban routes out of London Victoria, Charing Cross, Blackfriars and Cannon Street to destinations in South London and Kent and the first 20 Class 465/0s were repainted into Connex South Eastern Yellow and Blue livery in 1998 the same livery as seen on the 16 Class 365s introduced in June 1997.

Some are scheduled to be replaced by Class 707s, with two hauled to Worksop for store by Harry Needle Railroad Company in June 2021.

Two manufacturers

Due to the size of the original order, British Rail approached two separate manufacturers to supply the new rolling stock. The first two sub-classes (designated 465/0 and 465/1) were built by BREL/ABB while the third sub-class (465/2) as well as the two-car (466) units were built by Metro-Cammell. Although built to the same specification and utilised interchangeably, there are subtle differences between the two fleets and they do not share common parts. A Solid State Traction Converter package controls three-phase AC traction motors, which allows for rheostatic or regenerative dynamic braking. Primary braking system is electro-pneumatically actuated disc brakes, which is blended with the Dynamic brakes. Tachometers on every axle of the unit provide for Wheel Slip/Slide Protection.

Traction equipment replacement
Plans were drawn up in 2007 to improve reliability of the BREL and ABB units (Class 465/0 and 465/1) by the installation of new traction equipment. The new package was developed by Hitachi Rail. It was retrofitted across all 97 465/0 and 465/1s trains over the course of 2009/2010. Brush Traction, the supplier/manufacturer of the original traction equipment, worked as consultants to assist in retro-fitting the new equipment.

Refurbishment
In 2005, the first 34 465/2 units (465201-465234) were given an extensive refurbishment at Doncaster Works. This included new interior panelling, new flooring, new lighting, new seat moquette (in the same grey and blue design as on the Class 375 Electrostars) and the addition of a new first class seating area at the front and rear of the units, amongst other changes. This was done to allow them to be transferred to outer-suburban routes alongside the Class 375s. They would be replaced on inner suburban services by Class 376s. They were reclassified as a separate sub-fleet designated 465/9 (465901–465934) and replaced the remaining Class 423 slam-door stock. The last in Network SouthEast livery was repainted in September 2007.

Between 2010 and 2012, all Class 465/0 and 465/1s had an overhaul by RailCare of door systems, air systems, couplings and trailer bogies. It was also at this time that all of the seats were given a retrim in Southeastern current mauve and blue seat moquette.

A further refresh of the entire Class 465 fleet took place gradually from 2016. This included the installation of new wheelchair spaces and fully accessible toilets, more handrails and tactile floor surfaces in the vestibule areas, and louder more audible door alarms. This was in order to maintain RVAR (Railway Vehicle Accessibility Regulations) compliance. The Met-Cam units also had new doors fitted.

Fleet details

References

ABB multiple units
465
465
Train-related introductions in 1992
750 V DC multiple units